Alexandr Dolgopolov was the defending champion, but decided to compete at the 2011 Copa Claro instead.
Jaroslav Pospíšil defeated Guillermo Olaso in the final 6–1, 3–6, 6–3.

Seeds

Draw

Finals

Top half

Bottom half

References
 Main draw
 Qualifying draw

2011 Singles
Meknes,singles